The combined states of the African Union (AU) constitute the world's 11th largest economy with a nominal gross domestic product (GDP) of US$2263 billion. By measuring GDP by purchasing power parity (PPP), the African Union's economy totals US$1.515 trillion, ranking it 11th after Russia. At the same time, they have a combined total debt of US$200 billion.

The AU has only 2% of the world's international trade. But because over 90% of international trade consists of currency futures, Africa's 2% actually makes up the bulk of real commodity traded worldwide to include about 70% of the world's strategic minerals, including gold and aluminium. Africa is also a large market for European, American and Chinese industry.

The AU future confederation's goals include the creation of a free trade area, a customs union, a single market, a central bank, and a common currency, thereby establishing economic and monetary union.  The current plan is to establish an African Economic Community with a single currency (afro) by 2030*.*

References